Humperdinck or Humperdink is a surname. Notable people with the surname include:
 Engelbert Humperdinck (composer) (1854–1921), German composer
 Adelheid Wette nee Humperdinck (1858–1916), German author, composer, and folklorist; librettist of her brother Engelbert Humperdinck's opera Hansel and Gretel
 Engelbert Humperdinck (singer) (born 1936), English pop singer
 Oliver Humperdink (born John Jay Sutton) (1949–2011), American professional wrestling manager
 Prince Humperdinck, a character from the 1973 novel The Princess Bride and the 1987 film adaptation of the same name

See also
 Humperdink Duck, a Disney character, grandfather of Donald Duck